Georg Fabricius (23 April 1516 – 17 July 1571), born Georg Goldschmidt, was a Protestant German poet, historian and archaeologist who wrote in Latin during the German Renaissance.

Life 

Fabricius was born in Chemnitz in Saxony and educated at the University of Leipzig. Travelling in Italy with one of his pupils, he made an exhaustive study of the antiquities of Rome. He published the results in his Roma (1550), in which the correspondence between every discoverable relic of the old city and the references to them in ancient literature was traced in detail. In 1546 he was appointed rector of Saint Afra in Meissen.

In 1549 Fabricius edited the first short selection of Roman inscriptions  focusing specifically on legal texts. This was a key moment in the history of classical epigraphy: for the first time in print a humanist explicitly demonstrated the value of such archaeological remains for the discipline of law, and implicitly accorded texts inscribed in stone as authoritative a status as those recorded in manuscripts.

In his sacred poems he affected to avoid every word with the slightest savour of paganism; and he blamed the poets for their allusions to pagan divinities.

He encouraged music at his school, although he was not himself a musician.

Fabricius died at Meissen.

Works 

Principal works:

editions of Terence (1548), Virgil (1551) and Horace (1555, apud H. Petrum)
Roma (1550) 
Poëmatum sacrorum libri xxv. (1560)
Poëtarum veterum ecclesiasticorum opera Christiana (1562)
De Re Poëtica libri septem (1565)
Rerum Misnicarum libri septem (1569)

Famous Quote 
From: In Praise of Georgius Agricola
"Death comes to all
But great achievements raise a monument
Which shall endure until the sun grows old."

Posthumous:

Originum I illustrissimae stirpis Saxonicae libri septem (1597)
Rerum Germaniae magnae et Saxoniae universae memorabilium mirabiliumque volumina duo (1609).

A life of Georg Fabricius was published in 1839 by D. C. W. Baumgarten-Crusius, who in 1845 also issued an edition of Fabricius's Epistolae ad W Meurerum et alios aequales, with a short sketch De Vita Ge. Fabricius de gente Fabriciorum; see also F. Wachter in Ersch and Gruber's Allgemeine Encyclopädie.

References 

1516 births
1571 deaths
Archaeologists from Leipzig
16th-century German historians
German poets
German Protestants
People from Chemnitz
People from the Electorate of Saxony
German male poets
German male non-fiction writers
16th-century antiquarians